The Museum of Modern Art (MoMA) is an art museum located in Midtown Manhattan, New York City, on 53rd Street between Fifth and Sixth Avenues.

It plays a major role in developing and collecting modern art, and is often identified as one of the largest and most influential museums of modern art in the world. MoMA's collection offers an overview of modern and contemporary art, including works of architecture and design, drawing, painting, sculpture, photography, prints, illustrated and artist's books, film, and electronic media.

The MoMA Library includes about 300,000 books and exhibition catalogs, more than 1,000 periodical titles, and more than 40,000 files of ephemera about individual artists and groups. The archives hold primary source material related to the history of modern and contemporary art.

It attracted 1,160,686 visitors in 2021, an increase of 64% from 2020. It ranked 15th on the list of most visited art museums in the world in 2021.

History

Heckscher and other buildings (1929–1939)
The idea for the Museum of Modern Art was developed in 1929 primarily by Abby Aldrich Rockefeller (wife of John D. Rockefeller, Jr.) and two of her friends, Lillie P. Bliss and Mary Quinn Sullivan. They became known variously as "the Ladies" or "the adamantine ladies". They rented modest quarters for the new museum in the Heckscher Building at 730 Fifth Avenue in Manhattan, and it opened to the public on November 7, 1929, nine days after the Wall Street Crash. Abby Rockefeller had invited A. Conger Goodyear, the former president of the board of trustees of the Albright Art Gallery in Buffalo, New York, to become president of the new museum. Abby became treasurer. At the time, it was America's premier museum devoted exclusively to modern art, and the first of its kind in Manhattan to exhibit European modernism. One of Rockefeller's early recruits for the museum staff was the noted Japanese-American photographer Soichi Sunami (at that time best known for his portraits of modern dance pioneer Martha Graham), who served the museum as its official documentary photographer from 1930 until 1968.

Goodyear enlisted Paul J. Sachs and Frank Crowninshield to join him as founding trustees. Sachs, the associate director and curator of prints and drawings at the Fogg Museum at Harvard University, was referred to in those days as a "collector of curators". Goodyear asked him to recommend a director, and Sachs suggested Alfred H. Barr, Jr., a promising young protégé. Under Barr's guidance, the museum's holdings quickly expanded from an initial gift of eight prints and one drawing. Its first successful loan exhibition was in November 1929, displaying paintings by Van Gogh, Gauguin, Cézanne, and Seurat.

First housed in six rooms of galleries and offices on the 12th floor of Manhattan's Heckscher Building, on the corner of Fifth Avenue and 57th Street, the museum moved into three more temporary locations within the next 10 years. Abby Rockefeller's husband, John D. Rockefeller, Jr., was adamantly opposed to the museum (as well as to modern art itself) and refused to release funds for the venture, which had to be obtained from other sources and resulted in the frequent shifts of location. Nevertheless, he eventually donated the land for the current site of the museum, plus other gifts over time, and thus became in effect one of its greatest benefactors.

During that time, the museum initiated many more exhibitions of noted artists, such as the lone Vincent van Gogh exhibition on November 4, 1935. Containing an unprecedented 66 oils and 50 drawings from the Netherlands, as well as poignant excerpts from the artist's letters, it was a major public success due to Barr's arrangement of the exhibit, and became "a precursor to the hold van Gogh has to this day on the contemporary imagination".

53rd Street (1939–present)

1930s to 1950s
The museum also gained international prominence with the hugely successful and now famous Picasso retrospective of 1939–40, held in conjunction with the Art Institute of Chicago. In its range of presented works, it represented a significant reinterpretation of Picasso for future art scholars and historians. This was wholly masterminded by Barr, a Picasso enthusiast, and the exhibition lionized Picasso as the greatest artist of the time, setting the model for all the museum's retrospectives that were to follow. Boy Leading a Horse was briefly contested over ownership with the Solomon R. Guggenheim Museum. In 1941, MoMA hosted the ground-breaking exhibition, "Indian Art of the United States" (curated by Frederic Huntington Douglas and Rene d'Harnoncourt), that changed the way Native American arts were viewed by the public and exhibited in art museums.

Abby Rockefeller's son Nelson was selected by the board of trustees to become its president, in 1939, at the age of 30; he was a flamboyant leader and became the prime instigator and funding source of MoMA's publicity, acquisitions, and subsequent expansion into new headquarters on 53rd Street. His brother, David Rockefeller, also joined the museum's board of trustees, in 1948, and took over the presidency, when Nelson was elected governor of New York, in 1958.

David Rockefeller subsequently employed noted architect Philip Johnson to redesign the museum garden, and named it in honor of his mother, the Abby Aldrich Rockefeller Sculpture Garden. The Rockefeller family and he have retained a close association with the museum throughout its history, with the Rockefeller Brothers Fund funding the institution since 1947. Both David Rockefeller, Jr. and Sharon Percy Rockefeller (wife of former senator Jay Rockefeller) sit on the board of trustees. After the Rockefeller Guest House at 242 East 52nd Street was completed in 1950, some MoMA functions were held in the house until 1964.

In 1937, MoMA had shifted to offices and basement galleries in the Time-Life Building in Rockefeller Center. Its permanent and current home, now renovated, designed in the International Style by the modernist architects Philip L. Goodwin and Edward Durell Stone, opened to the public on May 10, 1939, attended by an illustrious company of 6,000 people, and with an opening address via radio from the White House by President Franklin D. Roosevelt.

1958 fire
On April 15, 1958, a fire on the second floor destroyed an  Monet Water Lilies painting (the current Monet Water Lilies was acquired shortly after the fire as a replacement). The fire started when workmen installing air conditioning were smoking near paint cans, sawdust, and a canvas drop cloth. One worker was killed in the fire and several firefighters were treated for smoke inhalation. Most of the paintings on the floor had been moved for the construction, although large paintings including the Monet were left. Art work on the third and fourth floors were evacuated to the Whitney Museum of American Art, which abutted it on the 54th Street side. Among the paintings that were moved was A Sunday Afternoon on the Island of La Grande Jatte, which had been on loan by the Art Institute of Chicago. Visitors and employees above the fire were evacuated to the roof and then jumped to the roof of an adjoining townhouse.

1960–1982
In 1969, the MoMA was at the center of a controversy over its decision to withdraw funding from the iconic antiwar poster And babies. In 1969, the Art Workers Coalition, a group of New York City artists who opposed the Vietnam War, in collaboration with Museum of Modern Art members Arthur Drexler and Elizabeth Shaw, created an iconic protest poster called And babies. The poster uses an image by photojournalist Ronald L. Haeberle and references the My Lai Massacre. The MoMA had promised to fund and circulate the poster, but after seeing the 2-by-3-foot poster, MoMA pulled financing for the project at the last minute. MoMA's board of trustees included Nelson Rockefeller and William S. Paley (head of CBS), who reportedly "hit the ceiling" on seeing the proofs of the poster. The poster was included shortly thereafter in MoMA's Information exhibition of July 2 to September 20, 1970, curated by Kynaston McShine. In 1971, after protests outside the museum meant to spur inclusion of African Americans Richard Hunt was the first African American sculptor to have a major solo retrospective at the museum. Another controversy involved Pablo Picasso's painting Boy Leading a Horse (1905–06), donated to MoMA by William S. Paley in 1964. The status of the work as being sold under duress by its German Jewish owners in the 1930s was in dispute. The descendants of the original owners sued MoMA and the Solomon R. Guggenheim Museum, which has another Picasso painting, Le Moulin de la Galette (1900), once owned by the same family, for return of the works. Both museums reached a confidential settlement with the descendants before the case went to trial and retained their respective paintings. Both museums had claimed from the outset to be the proper owners of these paintings, and that the claims were illegitimate. In a joint statement, the two museums wrote: "we settled simply to avoid the costs of prolonged litigation, and to ensure the public continues to have access to these important paintings."

1980–1999

In 1983, the museum more than doubled its gallery, increased the curatorial department by 30%, and added an auditorium, two restaurants, and a bookstore in conjunction with the construction of the 56-story Museum Tower adjoining the museum.

In 1997, the museum undertook a major renovation and expansion designed by Japanese architect Yoshio Taniguchi with Kohn Pedersen Fox. The project, including an increase in MoMA's endowment to cover operating expenses, cost $858 million in total. The project nearly doubled the space for MoMA's exhibitions and programs, and features  of space. The Peggy and David Rockefeller Building on the western portion of the site houses the main exhibition galleries, and The Lewis B. and Dorothy Cullman Education and Research Building provides space for classrooms, auditoriums, teacher-training workshops, and the museum's expanded library and archives. These two buildings frame the Abby Aldrich Rockefeller Sculpture Garden, which was enlarged from its original configuration.

21st century 
The museum was closed for two years in connection with the renovation and moved its public-facing operations to a temporary facility called MoMA QNS in Long Island City, Queens. When MoMA reopened in 2004, the renovation was controversial. Some critics thought that Taniguchi's design was a fine example of contemporary architecture, while many others were displeased with aspects of the design, such as the flow of the space. In 2005, the museum sold land that it owned west of its existing building to Hines, a Texas real estate developer, under an agreement that reserved space on the lower levels of the building Hines planned to construct there for a MoMA expansion.

In 2011, MoMA acquired an adjacent building constructed and occupied by the American Folk Art Museum on West 53rd Street. The building was a well-regarded structure designed by Tod Williams Billie Tsien Architects and was sold in connection with a financial restructuring of the Folk Art Museum. When MoMA announced that it would demolish the building in connection with its expansion, outcry and considerable discussion arose about the issue, but the museum ultimately proceeded with its original plans.

The Hines building, designed by Jean Nouvel and called 53W53, received construction approval in 2014. Around the time of the Hines' construction approval, MoMA unveiled its expansion plans, which encompass space in 53W53, as well as construction on the former site of the American Folk Art Museum. The expansion plan was developed by the architecture firm Diller Scofidio + Renfro in collaboration with Gensler. The first phase of construction began in 2014. In June 2017, patrons and the public were welcomed into MoMA to see the completion of the first phase of the $450 million expansion to the museum.Spread over three floors of the art mecca off Fifth Avenue are 15,000 square-feet (about 1,400 m2) of reconfigured galleries, a new, second gift shop, a redesigned cafe and espresso bar, and facing the sculpture garden, two lounges graced with black marble quarried in France.
The museum expansion project increased the publicly accessibly space by 25% compared to when the Tanaguchi building was completed in 2004. The expansion allowed for even more of the museum's collection of nearly 200,000 works to be displayed. The new spaces also allow visitors to enjoy a relaxing sit-down in one of the two new lounges, or even have a fully catered meal. The two new lounges include "The Marlene Hess and James D. Zirin Lounge" and "The Daniel and Jane Och Lounge". The goal of this renovation is to help expand the collection and display of work by women, Latinos, Blacks, Asians, and other marginalized communities. In connection with the renovation, MoMA shifted its approach to presenting its holdings, moving away from separating the collection by disciplines such as painting, design, and works on paper toward an integrated chronological presentation that encompasses all areas of the collection.

The Museum of Modern Art closed for another round of major renovations from June to October 2019. The expansion and refurbishment was overseen by the architectural firm of Diller Scofidio + Renfro. 

The institution began offering free online classes in April 2014.

Exhibition houses
The MoMA occasionally has sponsored and hosted temporary exhibition houses, which have reflected seminal ideas in architectural history.
 1949: exhibition house by Marcel Breuer
 1950: exhibition house by Gregory Ain
 1955: Japanese Exhibition House by Junzo Yoshimura, reinstalled in Philadelphia, PA in 1957–58 and known now as Shofuso Japanese House and Garden
 2008: Prefabricated houses planned by:
 Kieran Timberlake Architects
 Lawrence Sass
 System Architects: Jeremy Edmiston and Douglas Gauthier
 Leo Kaufmann Architects
 Richard Horden

Artworks

The MoMA is organized around six Curatorial Departments: Architecture and Design, Drawings and Prints, Film, Media and Performance, Painting and Sculpture, and Photography.

Considered by many to have the best collection of modern Western masterpieces in the world, the MoMA's holdings include more than 150,000 individual pieces in addition to roughly 22,000 films and 4 million film stills. (Access to the collection of film stills ended in 2002, and the collection is stored in a vault in Hamlin, Pennsylvania.). The collection houses such important and familiar works as the following:
 Francis Bacon, Painting (1946)
 Umberto Boccioni, The City Rises
 Paul Cézanne, The Bather
 Marc Chagall, I and the Village
 Giorgio de Chirico, The Song of Love
 Willem de Kooning, Woman I
 Salvador Dalí, The Persistence of Memory
 Max Ernst, Two Children Are Threatened by a Nightingale
 Paul Gauguin, Te aa no areois (The Seed of the Areoi)
 Jasper Johns, Flag
 Frida Kahlo, Self-Portrait With Cropped Hair
 Roy Lichtenstein, Drowning Girl
 René Magritte, The Empire of Lights
 René Magritte, False Mirror
 Kazimir Malevich, White on White 1918
 Henri Matisse, The Dance
 Henri Matisse, L’Atelier Rouge
 Piet Mondrian, Broadway Boogie-Woogie
 Claude Monet, Water Lilies triptych
 Barnett Newman, Broken Obelisk
 Barnett Newman, Vir Heroicus Sublimis (Man, Heroic and Sublime)
 Pablo Picasso, Les Demoiselles d'Avignon
 Jackson Pollock, One: Number 31, 1950
 Henri Rousseau, The Dream, 1910
 Henri Rousseau, The Sleeping Gypsy
 Vincent van Gogh, The Starry Night
 Andy Warhol, Campbell's Soup Cans
 Andrew Wyeth, Christina's World

Selected collection highlights

It also holds works by a wide range of influential European and American artists including Auguste Rodin, Henri Matisse, Pablo Picasso, Georges Braque, Joan Miró, Aristide Maillol, Piet Mondrian, Marcel Duchamp, Paul Klee, Fernand Léger, René Magritte, Henry Moore, Alberto Giacometti, Georgia O'Keeffe, Edward Hopper, Walker Evans, Dorothea Lange, Arshile Gorky, Hans Hofmann, Franz Kline, Willem de Kooning, Jackson Pollock, Mark Rothko, David Smith, Helen Frankenthaler, Morris Louis, Kenneth Noland, Robert Rauschenberg, Frank Stella, Andy Warhol, Roy Lichtenstein, Jean-Michel Basquiat and hundreds of others.

Photography
Concerning photography, "the MoMA collection is one of the most important in the world, consisting of over 25,000 works, not only by photographers, [but] also by journalists, scientists, entrepreneurs, and amateurs."

The Department of Photography was founded by Beaumont Newhall in 1940 and developed a world-renowned art photography collection under Edward Steichen (curator 1947–1961).  Steichen's most notable and lasting exhibit, named The Family of Man, was seen by 9 million people. In 2003, the Family of Man photographic collection was added to UNESCO's Memory of the World Register in recognition of its historical value.

Steichen's hand-picked successor, John Szarkowski (curator 1962–1991), guided the department with several notable exhibitions, including 1967s New Documents that presented photographs by Diane Arbus, Lee Friedlander, and Garry Winogrand and is said to have "represented a shift in emphasis" and "identified a new direction in photography: pictures that seemed to have a casual, snapshot-like look and subject matter so apparently ordinary that it was hard to categorize". Under Szarkowski, it focused on a more traditionally modernist approach to the medium, one that emphasized documentary images and orthodox darkroom techniques.

Peter Galassi (curator 1991-2011) worked under his predecessor, whereas Quentin Bajac (curator 2013–2018) was hired from the outside.  The current David Dechman Senior Curator of Photography is Roxana Marcoci, PhD.

Film
In 1932, museum founder Alfred Barr stressed the importance of introducing "the only great art form peculiar to the 20th century" to "the American public which should appreciate good films and support them". Museum Trustee and film producer John Hay Whitney became the first chairman of the museum's Film Library from 1935 to 1951. The collection Whitney assembled with the help of film curator Iris Barry was so successful that in 1937 the Academy of Motion Pictures Arts and Sciences commended the museum with an award "for its significant work in collecting films ... and for the first time making available to the public the means of studying the historical and aesthetic development of the motion picture as one of the major arts".

The first curator and founder of the film library was Iris Barry, a British film critic and author whose three decades of pioneering work in collecting films and presenting them in coherent artistic and historical contexts gained recognition for the cinema as the major new art form of our century. Barry and her successors have built a collection comprising some 8000 titles today, concentrating on assembling an outstanding collection of important works of international film art, emphasizing obtaining the highest-quality materials.

Exiled film scholar Siegfried Kracauer worked at the MoMA film archive on a psychological history of German film between 1941 and 1943. The result of his study, From Caligari to Hitler: A Psychological History of the German Film (1947), traces the birth of Nazism from the cinema of the Weimar Republic and helped lay the foundation of modern film criticism.

Under the Museum of Modern Art Department of Film, the film collection includes more than 25,000 titles and ranks as one of the world's finest museum archives of international film art. The department owns prints of many familiar feature-length movies, including Citizen Kane and Vertigo, but its holdings also contains many less-traditional pieces, including Andy Warhol's eight-hour Empire, Fred Halsted's gay pornographic L.A. Plays Itself (screened before a capacity audience on April 23, 1974), various TV commercials, and Chris Cunningham's music video for Björk's All Is Full of Love.

Library
The MoMA library is located in Midtown Manhattan, with offsite storage in Long Island City, Queens. The noncirculating collection documents modern and contemporary art, including painting, sculpture, prints, photography, film, performance, and architecture from 1880–present. The collection includes 300,000 books, 1,000 periodicals, and 40,000 files about artists and artistic groups. Over 11,000 artist books are in the collection. The libraries are open by appointment to all researchers. The library's catalog is called "Dadabase". Dadabase includes records for all of the material in the library, including books, artist books, exhibition catalogs, special collections materials, and electronic resources. The MoMA's collection of artist books includes works by Ed Ruscha, Marcel Broodthaers, Susan Bee, Carl Andre, and David Horvitz.

Additionally, the library has subscription electronic resources along with Dadabase. These include journal databases (such as JSTOR and Art Full Text), auction results indexes (ArtFact and Artnet), the ARTstor image database, and WorldCat union catalog.

Architecture and design

MoMA's Department of Architecture and Design was founded in 1932 as the first museum department in the world dedicated to the intersection of architecture and design. The department's first director was Philip Johnson who served as curator between 1932–34 and 1946–54. The next departmental head was Arthur Drexler, who was curator from 1951 to 1956 and then served as head until 1986.

The collection consists of 28,000 works including architectural models, drawings, and photographs. One of the highlights of the collection is the Mies van der Rohe Archive. It also includes works from such legendary architects and designers as Frank Lloyd Wright, Paul László, the Eameses, Betty Cooke, Isamu Noguchi, and George Nelson. The design collection contains many industrial and manufactured pieces, ranging from a self-aligning ball bearing to an entire Bell 47D1 helicopter. In 2012, the department acquired a selection of 14 video games, the basis of an intended collection of 40 that is to range from Pac-Man (1980) to Minecraft (2011).

Management

Attendance
MoMA attracted 706,060 visitors in 2020, a drop of sixty-five percent from 2019, due to the COVID-19 pandemic. It ranked twenty-fifth on the List of most visited art museums in the world in 2020.

MoMA has seen its average number of visitors rise from about 1.5 million a year to 2.5 million after its new granite and glass renovation. In 2009, the museum reported 119,000 members and 2.8 million visitors over the previous fiscal year. MoMA attracted its highest-ever number of visitors, 3.09 million, during its 2010 fiscal year; however, attendance dropped 11 percent to 2.8 million in 2011. Attendance in 2016 was 2.8 million, down from 3.1 million in 2015.

The museum was open every day since its founding in 1929, until 1975, when it closed one day a week (originally Wednesdays) to reduce operating expenses. In 2012, it again opened every day, including Tuesday, the one day it has traditionally been closed.

Admission
The Museum of Modern Art charges an admission fee of $25 per adult. Upon MoMA's reopening, its admission cost increased from $12 to $20, making it one of the most expensive museums in the city. However, it has free entry on Fridays after 5:30pm, as part of the Uniqlo Free Friday Nights program. Many New York area college students also receive free admission to the museum.

Finances
A private non-profit organization, MoMA is the seventh-largest U.S. museum by budget; its annual revenue is about $145 million (none of which is profit). In 2011, the museum reported net assets (basically, a total of all the resources it has on its books, except the value of the art) of just over $1 billion.

Unlike most museums, the museum eschews government funding, instead subsisting on a fragmented budget with a half-dozen different sources of income, none larger than a fifth. Before the economic crisis of late 2008, the MoMA's board of trustees decided to sell its equities in order to move into an all-cash position. An $858 million capital campaign funded the 2002–04 expansion, with David Rockefeller donating $77 million in cash. In 2005, Rockefeller pledged an additional $100 million toward the museum's endowment. In 2012, Standard & Poor's, a nationally recognized statistical rating organization, raised its long-term rating for the museum as it benefited from the fundraising of its trustees. After construction expenses for the new galleries are covered, the Modern estimates that some $65 million will go to its $650 million endowment.

MoMA spent $32 million to acquire art for the fiscal year ending in June 2012.

MoMA employed about 815 people in 2007. The museum's tax filings from the past few years suggest a shift among the highest paid employees from curatorial staff to management. The museum's director Glenn D. Lowry earned $1.6 million in 2009 and lives in a rent-free $6 million apartment above the museum.

MoMA was forced to close in March 2020 during the COVID-19 pandemic in New York City. Citing the coronavirus shutdown, MoMA fired its art educators in April 2020. In May 2020, it was reported that MoMA would reduce its annual budget from $180 to $135 million starting July 1. Exhibition and publication funding was cut by half, and staff reduced from around 960 to 800.

Key people

Officers and the board of trustees
Currently, the board of trustees includes 46 trustees and 15 life trustees. Even including the board's 14 "honorary" trustees, who do not have voting rights and do not play as direct a role in the museum, this amounts to an average individual contribution of more than $7 million. The Founders Wall was created in 2004, when MoMA's expansion was completed, and features the names of the actual founders in addition to those who gave significant gifts; about a half-dozen names have been added since 2004. For example, Ileana Sonnabend's name was added in 2012, even though she was only 15 when the museum was established in 1929.

In Memoriam – David Rockefeller (1915–2017)
 Honorary chairman – Ronald S. Lauder
 Chairman emeritus – Robert B. Menschel
 President emerita – Agnes Gund
 President emeritus – Donald B. Marron Sr.
 Chairman – Jerry I. Speyer
 Co-Chairman– Leon D. Black
 President – Marie-Josée Kravis

Vice chairmen:
 Sid R. Bass
 Mimi Haas
 Marlene Hess
 Richard E. Salomon
 Director – Glenn D. Lowry
 Treasurer – Richard E. Salomon
 Assistant treasurer – James Gara
 Secretary – Patty Lipshutz

Board of trustees
Board of trustees:

 Wallis Annenberg
 Sid R. Bass
 Lawrence B. Benenson
 Leon D. Black
 Clarissa Alcock Bronfman
 Patricia Phelps de Cisneros
 Edith Cooper
 Paula Crown
 David Dechman
 Anne Dias-Griffin
 Glenn Dubin
 John Elkann
 Laurence D. Fink
 Kathleen Fuld
 Howard Gardner
 Victoria Mihelson
 Mimi Haas
 Alexandra A. Herzan
 Marlene Hess
 Jill Kraus
 Marie-Josée Kravis
 Ronald S. Lauder
 Thomas H. Lee
 Michael Lynne
 Khalil Gibran Muhammad
 Philip S. Niarchos
 James G. Niven
 Peter Norton
 Maja Oeri
 Michael S. Ovitz
 David Rockefeller Jr.
 Sharon Percy Rockefeller
 Richard E. Salomon
 Marcus Samuelsson
 Anna Marie Shapiro
 Anna Deavere Smith
 Jerry I. Speyer
 Ricardo Steinbruch
 Daniel Sundheim
 Alice M. Tisch
 Edgar Wachenheim III
 Gary Winnick

Life trustees:
 Eli Broad
 Douglas S. Cramer
 Joel S. Ehrenkranz
 Gianluigi Gabetti
 Agnes Gund
 Barbara Jakobson
 Werner H. Kramarsky
 June Noble Larkin
 Donald B. Marron Sr.

 Robert B. Menschel
 Peter G. Peterson
 Emily Rauh Pulitzer
 David Rockefeller
 Jeanne C. Thayer

Honorary trustees:
 Lin Arison
 Jan Cowles
 Lewis B. Cullman
 H.R.H. Duke Franz of Bavaria
 Maurice R. Greenberg
 Wynton Marsalis
 Richard E. Oldenburg

 Richard Rogers
 Ted Sann
 Gilbert Silverman
 Yoshio Taniguchi
 Eugene V. Thaw

Directors
 Alfred H. Barr, Jr. (1929–1943)
 No director (1943–1949; the job was handled by the chairman of the museum's coordination committee and the director of the Curatorial Department)
 Rene d'Harnoncourt (1949–1968)
 Bates Lowry (1968–1969)
 John Brantley Hightower (1970–1972)
 Richard Oldenburg (1972–1995)
 Glenn D. Lowry (1995–present)

Chief curators
 Philip Johnson, chief curator of architecture and design (1932–1934 and 1946–1954)
 Arthur Drexler, chief curator of architecture and design (1951–1956)
 Peter Galassi, chief curator of photography (1991–2011)
 Cornelia Butler, chief curator of drawings (2006–2013)
 Barry Bergdoll, chief curator of architecture and design (2007–2013)
 Rajendra Roy, chief curator of film (2007–present)
 Ann Temkin, chief curator of painting and sculpture (2008–present)
 Klaus Biesenbach, director of MoMA PS1 and chief curator at large (2009–2018)
 Sabine Breitwieser, chief curator of media and performance art (2010–2013)
 Christophe Cherix, chief curator of prints and illustrated books (2010–2013), drawings and prints (2013–present)
 Paola Antonelli, director of research and development and senior curator of architecture and design (2012–present)
 Quentin Bajac, chief curator of photography (2012–2018)
 Stuart Comer, chief curator of media and performance art (2014–present)
 Martino Stierli, chief curator of architecture and design (2015–present)

Controversy

Women Artists Visibility Event (W.A.V.E.) 
On June 14, 1984 the Women Artists Visibility Event (W.A.V.E.), a demonstration of 400 women artists, was held in front of the newly renovated Museum of Modern Art to protest the lack of female representation in its opening exhibition, "An International Survey of Recent Painting and Sculpture". The exhibition featured 165 artists; only 14 of those were women.

Art repatriation issues 
The MoMA has been involved in several claims initiated by families for artworks lost in the Holocaust which ended up in the collection of the Museum of Modern Art.

In 2009, the heirs of German artist George Grosz filed a lawsuit seeking restitution of three works by Grosz, and the heirs of Paul von Mendelssohn-Bartholdy filed a lawsuit demanding the return of the painting by Pablo Picasso, entitled Boy Leading a Horse (1905–1906).

In another case, after a decade long court fight, in 2015 the MoMA returned a painting entitled Sand Hills by German artist Ernst Ludwig Kirchner to the Fischer family because it had been stolen by Nazis.

Strike MoMA 
Strike MoMA is a 2021 movement to strike the museum targeting what its supporters have called the "toxic philanthropy" of the museum's leadership.

See also

 List of museums and cultural institutions in New York City
 List of most-visited museums in the United States
 Dorothy Canning Miller
 Sam Hunter
 Solomon R. Guggenheim Museum
 Talk to Me (exhibition)
 The Family of Man exhibit (1955)
 WikiProject MoMA

References

Citations

Further reading 

 Allan, Kenneth R. "Understanding Information", in Conceptual Art: Theory, Myth, and Practice. Ed. Michael Corris. Cambridge: Cambridge University Press, 2004. pp. 144–168.
 
 Bee, Harriet S. and Michelle Elligott. Art in Our Time. A Chronicle of the Museum of Modern Art, New York 2004, .
 Fitzgerald, Michael C. Making Modernism: Picasso and the Creation of the Market for Twentieth-Century Art. New York: Farrar, Straus and Giroux, 1995.
 Geiger, Stephan. The Art of Assemblage. The Museum of Modern Art, 1961. Die neue Realität der Kunst in den frühen sechziger Jahren, (Diss. University Bonn 2005), München 2008, .
 Harr, John Ensor and Peter J. Johnson. The Rockefeller Century: Three Generations of America's Greatest Family. New York: Charles Scribner's Sons, 1988.
 Kert, Bernice. Abby Aldrich Rockefeller: The Woman in the Family. New York: Random House, 1993.
 Lynes, Russell, Good Old Modern: An Intimate Portrait of the Museum of Modern Art, New York: Athenaeum, 1973.
 
 Reich, Cary. The Life of Nelson A. Rockefeller: Worlds to Conquer 1908–1958. New York: Doubleday, 1996.

External links
 
 MoMA Exhibition History List (1929–Present)
 MoMA Audio
 MoMA's YouTube Channel
 MoMA's free online courses on Coursera
 MoMA Learning
 MoMA Magazine
 
 " MoMA to Close, Then Open Doors to a More Expansive View of Art" New York Times, 2019
Museum of Modern Art within Google Arts & Culture

 
1929 establishments in New York City
Art museums established in 1929
Art museums and galleries in New York City
Buildings and structures completed in 2004
Contemporary art galleries in the United States
Cultural infrastructure completed in 1937
Edward Durell Stone buildings
Institutions accredited by the American Alliance of Museums
Institutions founded by the Rockefeller family
Kohn Pedersen Fox buildings
Midtown Manhattan
Modern art museums in the United States
Modernist architecture in New York City
Museums in Manhattan
Museums of American art
Philip Johnson buildings
Compasso d'Oro Award recipients
FIAF-affiliated institutions